Proliferative phase can refer to:
 a phase of wound healing
 a phase of the menstrual cycle